PFC Lokomotiv Tashkent is an Uzbek professional football club based in Tashkent.

The owner and main sponsor of the club is a state-owned company Uzbek Railways.

History
Lokomotiv was founded in 18 February 2002. In 2002–2003 club played in second level of Uzbek Football – First League and from 2004 to 2010 in Uzbek League. In the 2009 season Lokomotiv, led by Vadim Abramov reached 6th position in league.

In 2010 Lokomotiv finished 13th and were relegated to the First League. In 2011, they gained promotion to Uzbek League again, finishing 2011 First League season in 1st position.

On 12 December 2011, Khoren Hovhannisyan was appointed as new head coach.

In June 2012 Khoren Oganesian left the club after his contract expired and Ravshan Muqimov was appointed as coach. At the end of the 2012 season the club finished 3rd after Pakhtakor Tashkent and Bunyodkor. This was the club's 2nd best performance in the league and qualified to play in the 2013 AFC Champions League for the first time. In the 2013 AFC Champions League qualifying play-off round Lokomotiv played against Al Nasr based in Dubai but Lokomotiv lost 3–2 and failed to qualify for the group stage of tournament.

In 2013 season Lokomotiv Tashkent finished 2nd after Bunyodkor for the first time in club's history and gained promotion to 2014 AFC Champions League play-off. On 9 February 2014 in 2014 AFC Champions League qualifying play-off round match in Tashkent against Al-Kuwait Lokomotiv lost with score 1:3 and finished its participation in the tournament. On 1 July 2014 in Uzbek Cup semi-final Lokomotiv overcame Pakhtakor in two leg competition by 3:2 and to play in Cup Final against Bunyodkor. In 2014 Cup Final match on 12 November 2014 in Olmaliq, Lokomotiv overcame Bunyodkor by 1:0 and won the trophy for the first time in its first Cup Final. The only goal scored in 106' midfielder Jasur Hasanov. In Uzbek League club finished 2014 season again as runners-up after Pakhtakor like the previous season.

On 8 March 2015, in Supercup match against Pakhtakor, Lokomotiv overcame by 4–0 and won its first SuperCup after a disappointing loss to Bunyodkor in 2014. In 2016 Lokomotiv made double by winning League and Uzbek Cup. Lokomotiv won 2016 League and became the champions for the first time in its history after three consequent seasons finishing as runners-up (2013-2015).
In 2017 Lokomotiv made its second double, winning second champions title and Cup.

Crest

Domestic

(1), (2). Brackets with numbers inside indicates the level of division within the Uzbek football league system
N/A = No answer

Continental

Stadium
The club played its home matches at TTYMI Stadium, a stadium of Tashkent Institute of Railway Transport Engineers. In 2009 Lokomotiv started with construction of a new 8,000-all-seater arena, Lokomotiv Stadium at the place of Traktor Tashkent Stadium and renovation works were finished in Spring 2012. The sport complex includes sporting facilities, a hotel and car parking for 270 vehicles. The new stadium was opened on 11 May 2012 with an official 2012 Uzbek League match between Lokomotiv and FK Andijan. Currently Lokomotiv plays its home matches both at Lokomotiv Stadium and TTYMI Stadium. As of 2017 all home games are played only at TTZ stadium.

Kit manufacturers and shirt sponsors
The shirt sponsor of Lokomotiv is the national rail carrier O'zbekiston Temir Yo'llari. Lokomotiv's shirts had been made by manufacturer Adidas until 2013. In February 2013, it was announced the club had signed a contract with Joma as the club's new kit manufacturer.

Players

Current squad

Current technical staff

Management

Honours
Uzbekistan Super League
Champions: 2016, 2017, 2018

Uzbekistan Pro League
Winners: 2011

Uzbekistan Cup
Winners:  2014, 2016, 2017

Uzbekistan Super Cup
Winners:  2015, 2019

Managerial history

Notable players
Had international caps for their respective countries. Players whose name is listed in bold represented their countries while playing for Lokomotiv.

Uzbekistan
 Ignatiy Nesterov
 Oleg Zoteev
 Timur Kapadze
 Alexander Geynrikh
 Server Djeparov
 Anzur Ismailov
 Sardor Rashidov
 Ivan Nagaev
 Sardor Mirzaev
 Jaloliddin Masharipov
 Jamshid Iskanderov
 Jovlon Ibrokhimov
 Husniddin Gafurov
 Ikromjon Alibaev
 Marat Bikmaev
 Vadim Afonin
 Sadriddin Abdullaev
 Islom Tukhtakhujaev
 Jasur Hasanov
 Azizbek Haydarov
 Victor Karpenko'''

Europe
 Ruslan Koryan
 Zhora Hovhannisyan
 Romik Khachatryan
 Aram Voskanyan
 Nemanja Janičić
 Mohammad Bindi Mustaffa
 Kakhi Makharadze
 Péter Vörös
  Arturas Fomenka
  Andrei Cojocari
 Alexandru Onica
 Slaven Stjepanović
  Damir Kojašević
  Slavko Damjanović
 Aleksandr Filimonov
 Alan Kusov
  Nikolay Pogrebnyak
  Kirill Pogrebnyak
  Evgeny Gogol
 Igor Jelić
 Nenad Petrović
 Jovan Đokić
 Filip Rajevac
 Ivan Kucherenko
 Vyacheslav Shevchenko
  Serhiy Litovchenko 

South and North America
 Everton Cavalkante
  Nivaldo Rodrigues
  Wilson Teixeira
  Ariagner Smith
Africa
  Mohamed Kone
  Gnohere Krizo
  Benito
  Okafor Obinna
Asia
  Cho Suk-jae
  Ýewgeniý Zemskow
  Arslanmyrat Amanow
  Artur Geworkyan
  Maksim Kazankov

References

External links
 PFC Lokomotiv Tashkent Official Website 
 PFC Lokomotiv Tashkent Supporters
 PFC Lokomotiv Tashkent – soccerway
 PFC Lokomotiv Tashkent – pfl.uz
 Weltfussballarchiv

 
Football clubs in Uzbekistan
Association football clubs established in 2002
2002 establishments in Uzbekistan
Railway association football teams